Christian I (3 November 1598 – 6 September 1654) was the Duke of Birkenfeld-Bischweiler from 1600 until 1654.

Life 
Christian was born in Birkenfeld in 1598 as the youngest son of Charles I, Count Palatine of Zweibrücken-Birkenfeld. His father's lands were partitioned after his death and Christian received the territory around Bischwiller (German: Bischweiler) in Alsace. Christian died in Neuenstein in 1654 and was buried in Bischwiller.

First marriage 
Christian married Magdalena Catherine of Palatinate-Zweibrücken (26 April 1607 – 20 January 1648), daughter of Duke John II, on 14 November 1630 and had the following children:
 unnamed son (13 September 1631)
 Gustavus Adolph (2 July 1632 – 4 August 1632)
 John Christian (16 June 1633 – 19 August 1633)
 Dorothea Catherine (3 July 1634 – 7 December 1715)
 Louise Sophie (16 August 1635 – 25 September 1691)
 Christian (1637 – 26 April 1717)
 John Charles (17 October 1638 – 21 February 1704)
 Anne Magdalena (14 February 1640 – 12 December 1693)
 Claire Sybille (20 February 1643 – 27 March 1644)

Second marriage 
After the death of his first wife, Christian married for the second time to Countess Maria Johanna of Helfenstein (1607–1648) (8 September 1612 – 20 August 1665), daughter of Count Rudolph III of Helfenstein (1585-1627) and Countess Eleonora zu Fürstenberg (1578-1651), widow of Maximilian Adam, Landgrave of Leuchtenberg , on 28 October 1648 and had the following son:
 unnamed son (1648)

Ancestors

References

1598 births
1654 deaths
House of Wittelsbach
Counts Palatine of Zweibrücken